Peter Guy Wolynes is an American theoretical chemist and physicist. Since 2011 he has been a Bullard-Welch Foundation Professor of Science and Professor of Chemistry at Rice University. He is widely recognized for his significant contributions to the theories of protein folding, glasses, and gene networks. Previously he was James R. Eiszner Professor at the University of Illinois at Urbana-Champaign, and the Francis H.C. Crick Chair of Physical Sciences at the University of California, San Diego.

Education and early life
Peter G. Wolynes was born in Chicago, Illinois on April 21, 1953. He graduated from Indiana University in 1971 with a B.A in Chemistry, and from Harvard University with a Ph.D in Chemical Physics in 1976.

Career and research
After a brief postdoctoral research at Massachusetts Institute of Technology with John Deutch, in the fall of 1976 he became an Assistant Professor at the Chemistry department of Harvard University at the age of 23. In 1980 he moved to the University of Illinois, eventually becoming the Center for Advanced Study Professor of Chemistry, Physics and Biophysics. In 2000 he moved to the Department of Chemistry and Biochemistry at the University of California, San Diego, as the Francis Crick Chair in the Physical Sciences. In addition to continuing his work on many body chemical physics, protein folding and structure prediction, he studied stochastic aspects of cell biology. In 2011 he moved to Rice University as the Bullard-Welch Foundation Professor of Science, and Professor of Chemistry and Physics.

As for 2022, Peter Wolynes has published more than 460 research articles and has an h-index equal to 117 according to his Google Scholar profile.

Energy landscape of protein folding:
Wolynes is worldwide known in the field of biophysics by his Energy Landscapes Theory and the Principle of Minimal Frustration. This theory, that was published in 1987  together with Joseph Bryngelson, states that naturally evolved proteins have optimised their folding energy landscapes and that nature has chosen amino acid sequences so that the folded state of the protein is sufficiently stable. In addition, the acquisition of the folded state had to become a sufficiently fast process. Even though nature has reduced the level of frustration in proteins, some degree of it remains up to now as can be observed in the presence of local minima in the energy landscape of proteins.

Awards
He is a member of the National Academy of Sciences and the German Academy of Sciences Leopoldina. He is a Fellow of the American Physical Society, the Biophysical Society, the American Philosophical Society, the American Academy of Arts and Sciences, and Foreign Member of the Royal Society. In 2012, he received the ACS Award in Theoretical Chemistry.

References

21st-century American chemists
Foreign Members of the Royal Society
Fellows of the American Academy of Arts and Sciences
Fellows of the American Physical Society
Living people
Indiana University alumni
Harvard Graduate School of Arts and Sciences alumni
Rice University faculty
1953 births
Members of the United States National Academy of Sciences
Foreign Fellows of the Indian National Science Academy
Santa Fe Institute people
Members of the American Philosophical Society